HMS Argyll was one of six  armoured cruisers built for the Royal Navy in the first decade of the 20th century. She was assigned to the 1st Cruiser Squadron of the Channel Fleet upon completion and was transferred to the 5th Cruiser Squadron of the Atlantic Fleet in 1909. Two years later, she was detached to escort the royal yacht during King George V's trip to British India. Argyll was assigned to the 3rd Cruiser Squadron of the reserve Second Fleet in 1913.

Upon mobilisation in mid-1914 her squadron was assigned to the Grand Fleet; Argyll did not see combat before she ran aground and was wrecked in October 1915. Her crew were rescued without loss and the wreck was later salvaged before it was demolished. Nonetheless, it remains diveable.

Design and description

Argyll was designed to displace . The engines were powered by sixteen Babcock & Wilcox and six cylindrical boilers. Argyll was the only ship of the class not to exceed  during her sea trials.

Her main armament consisted of four breech-loading (BL) 7.5-inch Mk I guns mounted in four single-gun turrets, one each fore and aft of the superstructure and one on each side. Her secondary armament of six BL 6-inch Mk VII guns was arranged in casemates amidships. Four of these were mounted on the main deck and were only usable in calm weather. Argyll also carried 18 quick-firing (QF) 3-pounder Hotchkiss guns and two submerged 18-inch torpedo tubes. Her two 12-pounder 8 cwt guns could be dismounted for service ashore.

At some point in the war, the main deck six-inch guns of the Devonshire-class ships were moved to the upper deck and given gun shields. Their casemates were plated over to improve seakeeping and the four 3-pounder guns displaced by the transfer were landed.

The armour of the gun turrets was also five inches thick whilst that of their barbettes was six inches thick.

Construction and service

Argyll, named to commemorate the Scottish county, was laid down at Scotts Shipbuilding & Engineering at their Greenock shipyard on 25 March 1902 and was launched on 3 March 1904. She was completed in December 1905 and was assigned to the 1st Cruiser Squadron of the Channel Fleet in January 1906. She was transferred to the 5th Cruiser Squadron of the Atlantic Fleet in 1909. Two years later she was detached from the squadron to escort the Royal Yacht  during the King's trip to the Delhi Durbar in India in 1911–12. She ran aground in Plymouth Sound on 28 December 1912. The following year she was assigned to the 3rd Cruiser Squadron of the Second Fleet.

The squadron was assigned to the Grand Fleet in mid-1914 as the Navy mobilised for war. It spent much of its time with the Grand Fleet reinforcing the patrols near the Shetland and Faeroe Islands and the Norwegian coast where Argyll captured a German merchantman on 6 August. She ran aground on the Bell Rock near Dundee on 28 October 1915 at coordinates  at night during a storm. During the war, lighthouses were ordered to switch their lights off for fear of assisting German U-boats in their operations, and the light was only turned on by special permission. En route Argyll sent a signal requesting the light to be turned on, but the lighthouse did not have a radio and could only contacted by boat or visual signals. Attempts to notify the lighthouse failed, but the ship was not notified of the failure and proceeded in the expectation of using the light. Soon afterwards, she ran aground at 04:30, suffering extensive damage to much of the hull and starting a fire.

The Navy salvaged all of the valuable items on board, including her guns, and she was demolished by the salvage team. In 1970 her two propellers were recovered by divers and sold for scrap. She remains a diveable wreck.

Notes

Footnotes

Bibliography

External links

 

Devonshire-class cruisers (1903)
Ships built on the River Clyde
1904 ships
World War I cruisers of the United Kingdom
World War I shipwrecks in the North Sea
Maritime incidents in 1915
Ships built by Scotts Shipbuilding and Engineering Company